Danielle Chartier is a Canadian politician. She was elected to the Legislative Assembly of Saskatchewan in a by-election on September 21, 2009, representing the electoral district of Saskatoon Riversdale as a member of the Saskatchewan New Democratic Party.  She was reelected in the 2011 and 2016 provincial elections. Chartier did not seek re-election in the 2020 provincial election.

She is a third-generation resident of the Saskatoon Riversdale constituency.

Originally trained as a journalist, she has worked as a reporter for daily newspapers in Moose Jaw and Saskatoon, as well as weekly newspapers and monthly magazines.

After obtaining a bachelor of social work degree from the University of Regina, she worked for the Saskatchewan Department of Labour's Work and Family Unit for nearly three years. She has also worked on projects for a number of community organizations including the Saskatchewan Association for Community Living, Catholic Family Services of Saskatoon and the Children's Discovery Museum on the Saskatchewan.

References

Living people
Saskatchewan New Democratic Party MLAs
Women MLAs in Saskatchewan
Fransaskois people
Politicians from Saskatoon
21st-century Canadian politicians
21st-century Canadian women politicians
Year of birth missing (living people)